Less Deep Inside Keeps is the first full-length studio album recorded by Soulside as a Sammich/Dischord (sr02/DIS22½) joint release. It was recorded at Inner Ear Studios in Arlington, Va. by Don Zientara and produced by Ian MacKaye in 1986. Originally released on vinyl, it was rereleased by Dischord Records (sr02CD) in 2003 on cd. Actually untitled, the artwork on either side of the spine is often used to identify it. Full spine title "Becoming Less Less Deep To Be Inside Nothing Keeps." The original release featured a grey cover. Repressings included green, blue and yellow. The artwork was created by Cynthia Connolly, illustrations by Chris Thomson and cover photo by Scott McCloud.  It is the only Soulside release to feature Chris Thomson on bass.

Track listing 
"Pearl to Stone" – 2:54
"One Step Higher" – 2:56
"Walking" – 2:05
"Don't Let Me Down" – 2:12
"You've Heard It Before" – 3:07
"Over and Out" – 2:22
"I Find the Other Side" – 3:28
"In Days to Come" – 2:38
"Dreams" – 3:02
"X-Lion Tamer" (Wire cover) — 1:36
"Fresh Air" – 2:35

Personnel 
 Alexis Fleisig – drums
 Scott McCloud – guitar
 Bobby Sullivan – vocals
 Chris Thomson – bass

References

External links 
 Soulside at Dischord.com
 Soulside at AllMusic

1987 debut albums
Soulside albums